The Oklahoma State Cowgirls basketball team represents Oklahoma State University–Stillwater and competes in the Big 12 Conference of NCAA Division I. The team's head coach is Jacie Hoyt, who was hired in March 2022.  The Cowgirls play their home games in the Gallagher-Iba Arena in Stillwater, Oklahoma.

History
OSU first fielded a women's team during the 1973–74 season.

Women's basketball coaches
Head women's basketball coaches
Jacy Showers, 1972–1976
Brenda Johnson, 1976–1977
Judy Bugher, 1977–1983
Dick Halterman, 1983–2002
Julie Goodenough, 2002–2005
Kurt Budke, 2005–2011
Jim Littell, 2011–2022; took over in November 2011 after the death of Kurt Budke in a 2011 plane crash.
Jacie Hoyt, 2022–present

Conferences 
OSU has played in the Big 8 and the Big 12 conferences. The school joined the Big 12 in 1997 when the Big 8 merged with several former members of the defunct Southwest Conference.

Year-by-year results

Conference tournament winners noted with # Source 

|-style="background: #ffffdd;"
| colspan="8" align="center" | Big Eight Conference

|-style="background: #ffffdd;"
| colspan="8" align="center" | Big 12 Conference

NCAA tournament results
The Cowgirls have appeared in 16 NCAA Tournaments, with a record of 12-16.

References

External links